Synaphea panhesya is a shrub endemic to Western Australia.

It blooms between August and September producing yellow flowers.

It is found in the Wheatbelt region of Western Australia between Gingin New Norcia and Chittering where it grows in gravelly-sandy-loamy soils.

References

Eudicots of Western Australia
panhesya
Endemic flora of Western Australia
Plants described in 1995